Andres Mathiesen (until 1938 Andrei Mathiesen; 1 December 1890 Sindi – 3 May 1955 near Stockholm) was an Estonian forest scientist. He was the first Estonian doctor and professor of forestry science.

In 1950 he graduated from St. Petersburg Forestry Institute. 1920-1944 he taught at Tartu University (since 1924 professor). 1941-1943 he was the prorector of Tartu University. In 1944 he moved to Sweden. 1951-1955 he worked at Stockholm Forestry Institute.

He was one of the founders of Estonian higher education of forestry. He was also one of the founders of Academical Forestry Association.

Awards:
 1940: Protection of Natural Amenities Medal, II rank

References

1890 births
1955 deaths
Estonian scientists